Cethosia myrina, the violet lacewing or brown accented butterfly, is a butterfly of the family Nymphalidae. It is found on the Indonesian islands of Sulawesi and Butung.

The wingspan is about 75 mm.

Subspecies
Cethosia myrina myrina (northern Sulawesi)
Cethosia myrina ribbei Honrath, 1887 (Banggai)
Cethosia myrina sarnada Fruhstorfer, 1912 (southern Sulawesi)
Cethosia myrina melancholia Fruhstorfer, 1912 (eastern Sulawesi)
Cethosia myrina vanbemmeleni Jurriansz, 1920 (Butung Island)

References

Acraeini
Butterflies of Indonesia
Butterflies described in 1867
Taxa named by Baron Cajetan von Felder
Taxa named by Rudolf Felder